Burton Dewitt Watson (June 13, 1925April 1, 2017) was an American sinologist, translator, and writer known for his English translations of Chinese and Japanese literature.  Watson's translations received many awards, including the Gold Medal Award of the Translation Center at Columbia University in 1979, the PEN Translation Prize in 1982 for his translation with Hiroaki Sato of From the Country of Eight Islands: An Anthology of Japanese Poetry, and again in 1995 for Selected Poems of Su Tung-p'o. In 2015, at age 88, Watson was awarded the PEN/Ralph Manheim Medal for Translation for his long and prolific translation career.

Life and career
Burton Watson was born on June 13, 1925, in New Rochelle, New York, where his father was a hotel manager. In 1943, at age 17, Watson dropped out of high school to join the U.S. Navy, and was stationed on repair vessels in the South Pacific during the final years of the Pacific Theatre of World War II. His ship was in the Marshall Islands when the war ended in August 1945, and on September 20, 1945 it sailed to Japan to anchor at the Yokosuka Naval Base, where Watson had his first direct experiences with Japan and East Asia. As he recounts in Rainbow World, on his first shore leave, he and his shipmates encountered a stone in Tokyo with musical notation on it; they sang the melody, as best they could. Some months later, Watson realized that he had been in Hibiya Park and that the song was "Kimigayo".

Watson left Japan in February 1946, was discharged from the Navy, and was accepted into Columbia University on the G.I. Bill, where he majored in Chinese.  His main Chinese teachers were the American Sinologist L. Carrington Goodrich and the Chinese scholar Wang Chi-chen.  At that time, most of the Chinese curriculum focused on learning to read Chinese characters and Chinese literature, as it was assumed that any "serious students" could later learn to actually speak Chinese by going to China. He also took one year of Japanese. Watson spent five years studying at Columbia, earning a B.A. in 1949 and an M.A. in 1951.

After receiving his master's degree, Watson hoped to move to China for further study, but the Communist Party of Chinawho had taken control of China in 1949 with their victory in the Chinese Civil Warhad closed the country to Americans. He was unable to find any positions in Taiwan or Hong Kong, and so moved to Japan using the last of his GI savings. Once there, he secured two positions in Kyoto: as an English teacher at Doshisha University, and as graduate student and a research assistant to Professor Yoshikawa Kōjirō of the Chinese Language and Literature at Kyoto University. His combined salary, including tutoring English several evenings per week, was about $50 per month, and so he lived much like other Japanese graduate students. In 1952, he was able to resign his position at Doshisha, thanks to Columbia University stipend for Sources in Chinese Tradition, and later in the year, a position as a Ford Foundation Overseas Fellow. Although he had long been interested in translating poetry, his first significant translations were of kanshi (poems in Chinese written by Japanese), made in 1954 for Donald Keene, who was compiling an anthology of Japanese literature. A few years later, he sent some translations of early Chinese poems from the Yutai Xinyong to Ezra Pound for comment; Pound replied but did not critique the translations. In subsequent years, Watson became friends with Gary Snyder, who lived in Kyoto in the 1950s, and through him Cid Corman and Allen Ginsberg.

In 1956 he earned a Ph.D. from Columbia with a doctoral dissertation on 1st century BC historian Sima Qian entitled "Ssu-ma Ch'ien: The Historian and His Work". He then worked as a member of Ruth Fuller Sasaki's team translating Buddhist texts into English, under the auspices of the Columbia University Committee on Oriental Studies, returning to Columbia in August 1961.  He subsequently taught at Columbia and Stanford  as a professor of Chinese. He and colleague Professor Donald Keene frequently participated in the seminars of William Theodore de Bary given to students at Columbia University.

Watson moved to Japan in 1973, where he remained for the rest of his life, and devoted much of his time to translation, both of literary works, and of more routine texts such as advertisements, instruction manuals, and so forth. He never married, but was in a long-term relationship with his partner Norio Hayashi.  He stated, in an interview with John Balcom, that his translations of Chinese poetry were greatly influenced by the translations of Pound and Arthur Waley, particularly Waley. While in Japan, he took up Zen meditation and kōan study. Although he worked as a translator for the Soka Gakkai, a Japanese Buddhist organization, he was not a follower of the Nichiren school of Buddhism or a member of the Soka Gakkai. Despite his extensive activity in translating ancient Chinese texts, his first time in China was a three-week trip in the summer of 1983, with expenses paid by the Soka Gakkai.

Watson died on April 1, 2017, aged 91, at the Hatsutomi Hospital in Kamagaya, Japan.

Translations
Translations from Chinese include:
 The Lotus Sutra and Its Opening and Closing Sutras, Soka Gakkai, 2009 
 Late Poems of Lu You, Ahadada Books, 2007
 Analects of Confucius, 2007
 The Record of the Orally Transmitted Teachings, 2004
 The Selected Poems of Du Fu, 2002
 Vimalakirti Sutra, New York: Columbia University Press 1996
 Selected Poems of Su Tung-P'o, Copper Canyon Press, 1994
 The Lotus Sutra, Columbia University Press, 1993
 Records of the Grand Historian: Han Dynasty, Columbia University Press, 1993, .
 The Tso Chuan: Selections from China’s Oldest Narrative History, 1989
 Chinese Lyricism: Shih Poetry from the Second to the Twelfth Century, 1971
 Cold Mountain: 100 Poems by the T’ang Poet Han-Shan, 1970
 The Old Man Who Does As He Pleases: Selections from the Poetry and Prose of Lu Yu, 1973
 Chinese Rhyme-Prose: Poems in the Fu Form from the Han and Six Dynasties Periods, 1971
 The Complete Works of Chuang Tzu, 1968
 Su Tung-p'o: Selections from a Sung Dynasty Poet, 1965
 Chuang Tzu: Basic Writings, 1964
 Han Fei Tzu: Basic Writings, 1964
 Hsün Tzu: Basic Writings, 1963
 Mo Tzu: Basic Writings, 1963
 Early Chinese Literature, 1962
 Records of the Grand Historian of China, 1961
 Ssu-ma Ch'ien, Grand Historian of China, 1958
 Chinese Rhyme-Prose: Poems in the Fu Form from the Han and Six Dynasties Periods. Rev. ed. New York Review Books, 2015.

Translations from Japanese include:
 The Tale of the Heike, 2006
 For All My Walking: Free-Verse Haiku of Taneda Santōka with Excerpts from His Diaries, 2004
 The Writings of Nichiren Daishonin, vol 1 in 1999 and vol 2 in 2006
 The Wild Geese (Gan, by Mori Ōgai), 1995
 Saigyō: Poems of a Mountain Home, 1991
 The Flower of Chinese Buddhism (Zoku Watakushi no Bukkyō-kan, by Ikeda Daisaku), 1984
 Grass Hill: Poems and Prose by the Japanese Monk Gensei, 1983
 Ryōkan: Zen Monk-Poet of Japan, 1977
 Buddhism: The First Millennium (Watakushi no Bukkyō-kan, by Ikeda Daisaku), 1977
 The Living Buddha (Watakushi no Shakuson-kan, by Ikeda Daisaku), 1976

Many of Watson's translations have been published through the Columbia University Press.

Notes

References

Watson, Burton. The Rainbow World: Japan in Essays and Translations (1990) Broken Moon Press. 
Halper, Jon, ed. Gary Snyder: Dimensions of a Life (1991) Sierra Club Books. 
Stirling, Isabel. "Zen Pioneer: The Life & Works of Ruth Fuller Sasaki" (2006)  Shoemaker & Hoard. 
Kyger, Joanne. "Strange Big Moon: The Japan and India Journals: 1960-1964" (2000) North Atlantic Books. .

External links
 Biographical sketch
 Burton Watson Obituary (Paid NYT Death Notice)
 Burton Watson reading from The Old Man Who Does As He Pleases
 Lucas Klein, Not Altogether an Illusion: Translation and Translucence in the Work of Burton Watson World Literature Today (May–August 2004).

1925 births
2017 deaths
20th-century American writers
21st-century American non-fiction writers
Academics from New York (state)
American expatriate academics
American expatriates in Japan
American sinologists
American translators
Chinese–English translators
Columbia College (New York) alumni
Japanese–English translators
Writers from Chiba Prefecture
Writers from New Rochelle, New York
United States Navy personnel of World War II